Hawk Cove is a city in Hunt County, Texas, United States. The population was recorded as 483 at the 2010 census.
Hawk Cove and Hunt County are both part of the Dallas–Fort Worth–Arlington Metropolitan Statistical Area.

Geography

Hawk Cove is located at  (32.882078, –96.080304), south of State Highway 276 and east of FM 751 in southern Hunt County, approximately 16 miles south of Greenville.

Hawk Cove is situated on Lake Tawakoni, a  reservoir constructed in 1960.

History
Development of the primarily residential community began in the early 1970s by property owners Sawyer and Culberson. Properties were originally known as Whiskers Retreat Nos. 1, 2, and 3. In January 1999, the community incorporated under the name Hawk Cove. The city has experienced a 34 percent increase in population since 2000, rising from 457 to over 600 by 2008.

Demographics

As of the census of 2000, there were 457 people, 174 households, and 127 families residing in the city. The population density was 1,465.7 people per square mile (569.2/km2). There were 245 housing units at an average density of 785.8 per square mile (305.1/km2). The racial makeup of the city was 93.87% White, 1.09% African American, 1.09% Native American, 0.22% Asian, 1.31% from other races, and 2.41% from two or more races. Hispanic or Latino of any race were 6.78% of the population.

There were 174 households, out of which 24.7% had children under the age of 18 living with them, 52.3% were married couples living together, 13.2% had a female householder with no husband present, and 27.0% were non-families. 23.0% of all households were made up of individuals, and 12.1% had someone living alone who was 65 years of age or older. The average household size was 2.63 and the average family size was 2.99.

In the city, the population was spread out, with 25.8% under the age of 18, 7.2% from 18 to 24, 24.5% from 25 to 44, 25.6% from 45 to 64, and 16.8% who were 65 years of age or older. The median age was 40 years. For every 100 females, there were 88.1 males. For every 100 females age 18 and over, there were 84.2 males.

The median income for a household in the city was $23,226, and the median income for a family was $23,669. Males had a median income of $31,071 versus $21,750 for females. The per capita income for the city was $10,375. About 10.1% of families and 9.6% of the population were below the poverty line, including 11.6% of those under age 18 and 17.5% of those age 65 or over.

Education
Public education in the city of Hawk Cove is provided by the Quinlan Independent School District.

References

External links

 City of Hawk Cove – Official site.

Dallas–Fort Worth metroplex
Cities in Texas
Cities in Hunt County, Texas